USS Flint may refer to the following ships of the United States Navy:

, was renamed Vincennes (CL-64) on 16 October 1942 before being launched on 17 July 1943
, was commissioned 31 August 1944 and decommissioned 6 May 1947
, was commissioned 20 November 1971, decommissioned 4 August 1995 and is currently in service with Military Sealift Command

United States Navy ship names